Pavagada Assembly constituency is one of the 224 constituencies in the Karnataka Legislative Assembly of Karnataka a south state of India. It is also part of Chitradurga Lok Sabha constituency.

Members of Legislative Assembly

Mysore State
 1951 (Seat-1): C. T. Hanumanthaiah, Indian National Congress
 1951 (Seat-2): Mali Mariyappa, Indian National Congress

 1962: R. Kenchappa, Indian National Congress

 1967: P. Anjanappa, Indian National Congress

 1972: K. R. Thimmarayappa, Indian National Congress

Karnataka State
 1978: Nagappa, Indian National Congress (Indira)

 1983: Ugranarasimhappa, Independent

 1985: Somla Naik, Janata  Party

 1989: Venkataramanappa, Indian National Congress

 1994: Somla Naik, Janata Dal

 1999: Venkataramanappa, Indian National Congress

 2004: K. M. Thimmarayappa, Janata Dal (Secular)

 2008: Venkataramanappa, Indian National Congress

 2013: K. M. Thimmarayappa, Janata Dal (Secular)

 2018: Venkataramanappa, Indian National Congress

See also
 List of constituencies of Karnataka Legislative Assembly
 Tumkur district

References

Assembly constituencies of Karnataka
Tumkur district